Dutch Celebes refers to the period of colonial governance on the island of Sulawesi - as a commandment of the Dutch East India Company from 1699 until its demise in the early 1800s, and then as a part of the Netherlands Indies or Dutch East Indies until 1945. Dutch presence in the region started with the capture of Sulawesi from the Portuguese, and ended with the establishment of the State of East Indonesia. Celebes is now referred to as Sulawesi. Makassar, the capital, was also referred to as: Macassar, Makassar, Macaçar, Mancaçar, or Goa, Gowa (not to be confused with Goa, the capital of Portuguese India).

History
Sulawesi prior to Dutch governance had been a part of the Sultanate of Gowa. In 1660 a large fleet under Johan van Dam bombarded Makassar.  From 1667 onward the VOC held Fort Rotterdam in the port of Makassar. The fortress was established in 1669. After four months of conflict to force Sultan Hasanuddin to submit, on 18 November 1667 the Treaty of Bongaya was signed, by which Dutch governance was accepted. Celebes and Dependencies ("Celebes en Onderhoorigheden") was the name of a government of 1847-1924 and from 1925 of a residence of the Dutch East Indies, divided into sections. The capital was Makassar, which before 1847 had been the name of the government.

Governors
Johan Sautijn (-1737)
Adriaan Hendrik Smout (1737-)
Joan Gideon Loten (1744-1750)
Roelof Blok
Charles Christiaan Tromp
 
 
J. Grudelbach
Jan David van Schelle (1821-1825)
Albert Cornells de Brauw (1855-1857)
Dirk Francois Schaap (1857-1859)
Johannis Antonius Bakkers (1865)
Willem Egbert Kroesen

See also
Fort Rotterdam
Dutch East Indies
Makassar

References

Dutch East Indies
European colonisation in Asia
1699 establishments in the Dutch Empire